Dear Evan Hansen is a musical with music and lyrics by Benj Pasek and Justin Paul, and a book by Steven Levenson. The musical follows Evan Hansen, a high school senior with social anxiety, "who invents an important role for himself in a tragedy that he did not earn".

The musical opened on Broadway at the Music Box Theatre in December 2016, after the show's world premiere at the Arena Stage in Washington, D.C. in July 2015, and an Off-Broadway production at Second Stage Theatre from March to May 2016. The show closed on September 18, 2022.

Upon opening, the show received critical acclaim. At the 71st Tony Awards, it was nominated for nine awards, winning six, including Best Musical, Best Book, Best Score, Best Actor for Ben Platt, and Best Featured Actress for Rachel Bay Jones.

A film adaptation was directed by Stephen Chbosky and co-produced by Marc Platt, the father of Ben Platt, who reprised his performance in the title role. Released on September 24, 2021, it was a box-office disappointment and received negative reviews from critics. This, along with soft ticket sales caused by the COVID-19 pandemic, became the leading factors that would cause both the Broadway and West End productions to close.

Production history
There were several readings prior to the first stage production, all in New York:
 May 2014 at Pearl Studios
 July 2014 at Chelsea Studios
 September 2014 at Manhattan Movement and Arts Studio

A full workshop took place in March 2015 at Gibney Dance Center. It was initially called The PPL Project. Platt was involved in all readings and the workshop.

Plot

Act 1
Evan Hansen, a bullied 17-year-old with social anxiety and depression with a recently broken arm, is assigned by his therapist Dr. Sherman to write letters to himself detailing what will be good about each day. His overworked mother Heidi suggests that he ask people to sign the cast on his arm to make friends. Meanwhile, Cynthia and Larry Murphy struggle to connect with their son Connor, a sullen drug user ("Anybody Have a Map?"). 

At school, Evan meets precocious classmate Alana and his reluctant "family friend" Jared, both of whom decline to sign his cast. Evan runs into Connor Murphy, who misinterprets his awkwardness for hostility and pushes him to the ground. Connor's sister Zoe, with whom Evan is infatuated, feels obliged to apologize for her brother's behavior. Evan wonders if this is his destiny in life ("Waving Through a Window"). Evan writes a letter to himself in the school library (begun with "Dear Evan Hansen,"...), wondering how he could talk to Zoe and if anyone at school would notice if he disappeared ("Waving Through a Window" [Reprise #1]). Connor bumps into Evan again, this time ironically offering to sign his cast. He finds Evan's letter on the printer and, at the mention of Zoe, becomes furious and storms out, taking the letter with him. Meanwhile, Alana ponders her own inner anxieties ("Waving Through a Window" [Reprise #2]).

Days later, Evan is called to the principal's office, where Connor's parents tell him that their son had died by suicide. They found Evan's letter in Connor's pocket, and mistakenly believe it was written by their son, indicating a close friendship between them; Connor's signature on his cast strengthens that belief, despite Evan's fumbling attempts to explain. The Murphys invite Evan to their house for dinner, where he is awkward and uncomfortable, so he tells them what he thinks they want to hear, pretending that he and Connor had secretly been best friends, and recounting a fictional version of the day he broke his arm at an abandoned apple orchard the family had visited years ago ("For Forever"). He enlists Jared's help in creating fake, backdated email conversations between him and Connor ("Sincerely, Me").

After Evan shows the Murphys "Connor's" emails, Cynthia is ecstatic that her son had a friend, but Larry is hurt that Connor took his family and his privileged life for granted, and Zoe still refuses to mourn him ("Requiem"). However, after reading the "suicide note," Zoe notices that she is mentioned fondly and asks Evan why Connor would say that about her, so he tells her all the reasons he loves her under the guise of Connor saying them ("If I Could Tell Her"). Evan impulsively kisses Zoe, but she pulls away and tells him to leave.

Evan, egged on by a subconscious Connor-figure, enlists Alana and Jared's help in founding "The Connor Project" to keep Connor's memory alive, which the Murphys eagerly encourage. Cynthia asks Evan to wear Connor's necktie at its official launch ("Disappear"). Evan suffers a panic attack but composes himself during the speech, which goes viral online. Zoe, overcome by the impact her brother and Evan have had, kisses him. Meanwhile, Heidi discovers Evan's viral video ("You Will Be Found").

Act 2
Evan and Alana pitch a fundraising campaign on The Connor Project's website, to raise $50,000 to restore the abandoned apple orchard. Meanwhile, Jared continues to help Evan write fabricated emails ("Sincerely Me" [Reprise]). After Heidi learns about Evan's speech about Connor online, she asks him why she never knew about this or about the "friendship", and they get into a fight. Evan runs off to the Murphys' house, where he bonds with Larry, who offers Evan Connor's old, unused baseball glove ("To Break In a Glove"). Zoe tells Evan that she doesn't want their relationship to be about Connor, but about the two of them ("Only Us"). Evan becomes preoccupied with Zoe and begins to neglect Heidi, Jared, and The Connor Project.

On one of his many visits to the Murphys, Evan finds they invited Heidi for dinner. She is offended to learn they want to give Connor's college fund to Evan. At home, Heidi and Evan have a fight, with Evan telling her he has found family in her absence. Heidi, Alana, and Jared converge in Evan's conscience, compounding his guilt and doubt over his decisions ("Good for You"). He debates with his subconscious Connor-figure whether he should tell the truth ("For Forever" [Reprise]).

Alana has become suspicious about Evan's "friendship" with Connor, so Evan shows her Connor's "suicide note", which paints a more bitter picture than the letters about the boys' friendship. Realizing that the letter is the key to fulfilling the fundraising goal for The Connor Project, Alana posts it online where, to Evan's chagrin, it also goes viral. The public begin to blame Connor's wealthy, previously dysfunctional family for his suicide ("You Will Be Found" [Reprise]), making them the targets of harassment. Evan walks in on the Murphys fighting among themselves about the blame, and finally admits to them his fabrication. As the Murphys leave in disgust, Evan absorbs his perceived brokenness as inescapable ("Words Fail"). Heidi recognizes the "suicide note" online as one of Evan's therapy assignments and apologizes to him for not seeing how badly he had been hurting. She recalls the day his father moved out, and promises that she will always be there for him when he needs her ("So Big / So Small").

A year later, Evan is still living with his mother, working at a store to earn enough money to go to college the next semester. Zoe invites him to meet her at the orchard, which has been reopened in Connor's memory, and they connect for the first time since Evan told the truth. He apologizes for the pain he caused and Zoe forgives him, saying the ordeal brought her family closer together. They share a moment before parting ways, in which Evan asks why she wanted to meet him at the orchard. She says it was a way to finally get him to come and see the orchard. 

Evan mentally writes himself one last letter reflecting on the impact he has had on his community and questions what's to come next ("Finale").

Roles and principal casts

Cast

Notable Broadway cast replacements
Evan Hansen: Noah Galvin, Taylor Trensch, Andrew Barth Feldman, Jordan Fisher, Ben Levi Ross, Zachary Noah Piser, Stephen Christopher Anthony, and Sam Primack
Zoe Murphy: Mallory Bechtel, Gabrielle Carrubba, Talia Simone Robinson
Heidi Hansen: Lisa Brescia, Jessica Phillips
Cynthia Murphy: Christiane Noll, Ann Sanders
Larry Murphy: Ivan Hernandez, Manoel Felciano
Connor Murphy: Alex Boniello, David Jeffery, Noah Kieserman
Jared Kleinman: Sky Lakota-Lynch,  Jared Goldsmith, Gaten Matarazzo
Alana Beck: Phoenix Best, Samantha Williams, Phoebe Koyabe

Characters
 Evan Hansen – A high school senior with social anxiety. He is assigned by his therapist to write letters to himself about why each day will be good, which becomes the catalyst for the plot of the story (hence the name, Dear Evan Hansen).
 Heidi Hansen – Evan's mother, a nurse's aide who attends paralegal school at night, often leaving Evan on his own as a result.
 Connor Murphy – A classmate of Evan and high school senior who, like Evan, is also a social outcast with no friends, and a frequent drug user, getting high to cope with his aggressive and violent tendencies. Connor eventually commits suicide during Act 1. His ghost appears in Evan's mind through out the rest of the musical.
 Zoe Murphy – Connor's younger sister and Evan's longtime crush. She was never close to Connor, even hated him and thought he was a monster, but wishes she had known him better and turns to Evan after he lies and says he was friends with Connor.
 Cynthia Murphy – Connor and Zoe's stay-at-home mother. She is constantly trying to keep her fragile family from falling apart but is often unsuccessful.
 Larry Murphy – Connor and Zoe's busy and distant father.
 Alana Beck – Evan's earnest but melodramatic classmate. She is constantly looking for academic and extracurricular activities to boost her collegiate chances.
 Jared Kleinman – Evan's droll and sarcastic friend. He helps Evan and Alana found The Connor Project.

Musical numbers

Act 1
 "Anybody Have a Map?" – Heidi, Cynthia 
 "Waving Through a Window" – Evan
 "Waving Through a Window (Reprise #1)"* – Evan
 "Waving Through a Window (Reprise #2)"* – Alana
 "For Forever" – Evan
 "Sincerely, Me" – Connor, Evan, Jared
 "Requiem" – Zoe, Cynthia, Larry
 "If I Could Tell Her" – Evan, Zoe
 "Disappear" – Connor, Evan, Alana, Jared, Larry, Cynthia, Zoe
 "You Will Be Found" – Evan, Alana, Jared, Zoe, Company, VC (virtual community)

Act 2
 "Sincerely, Me (Reprise)"* – Connor, Jared
 "To Break In a Glove" – Larry, Evan
 "Only Us" – Zoe, Evan
 "Good for You" – Heidi, Alana, Jared, Evan 
 "For Forever (Reprise)"* – Connor
 "You Will Be Found (Reprise)"* – Alana, Jared, VC 
 "Words Fail" – Evan
 "So Big / So Small" – Heidi
 "Finale" – Evan, Company
*Not included on the Original Broadway Cast Recording

Orchestration
The show is orchestrated for a band of eight, including the music director. The parts are: MD/Keyboard; Violin; Viola; Violoncello; Guitar 1; Guitar 2; Bass Guitar/Upright Bass; and Drums. The show was orchestrated by Alex Lacamoire, who won the 2017 Tony Award for Best Orchestrations for his work.

Recording

An original Broadway cast album was released at midnight on January 27, 2017, by Atlantic Records. The second song on the album, "Waving Through a Window", was released as a special early download for those who had pre-ordered the album. The fifth song, "Requiem", was made available to stream for 24 hours on January 19, 2017, a week before the release of the cast recording. The song was released as a second pre-order bonus the next day. The recording of the Act 1 finale "You Will Be Found" was available for a first listen online on January 23, 2017. The cast album debuted at number 8 on the February 25 Billboard 200. The cast album became available in compact disc format on February 17, 2017. The cast album, produced by Alex Lacamoire, featuring the band from both the original off-Broadway and Broadway productions, including Ben Cohn (piano), Jamie Eblen (drums), Justin Goldner and Dillon Kondor (guitars), Rob Jost (bass), Justin Smith, Todd Low and Adele Stein (strings) and won the 2018 Grammy Award for Best Musical Theater Album.

Producers announced a deluxe album on September 26, 2018. The deluxe album contains all of the songs in the Original Broadway Cast Recording, in addition to cut songs and covers. The cut song "Part of Me" was available exclusively on Billboard.com before it was officially released. The album was to be released on October 19; however, it was delayed to November 2. American singer Katy Perry re-recorded "Waving Through a Window" to promote the show's national tour. Other songs on the deluxe album include "Obvious" sung by Taylor Trensch, the precursor to "If I Could Tell Her", "Hiding in Your Hands" sung by Mallory Bechtel which was replaced by "Requiem", and an acoustic version of "Disappear" sung by Taylor Trensch and Alex Boniello.

Productions

Original Washington, D.C., production

Dear Evan Hansen premiered at the Arena Stage in Washington, D.C., running from July 10 to August 23, 2015. Directed by Michael Greif, the production featured orchestrations by Alex Lacamoire, music direction by Ben Cohn, set design by David Korins and projection design by Peter Nigrini. Ben Platt featured in the title role.

Original off-Broadway production
The musical opened off-Broadway at the Second Stage Theater on March 26, 2016, in previews, with the official opening on May 1. The cast featured Ben Platt, Laura Dreyfuss, Mike Faist, Rachel Bay Jones, Will Roland, John Dossett, and Jennifer Laura Thompson repeating their roles from the Arena Stage production. New cast members were Michael Park and Kristolyn Lloyd. Michael Greif again directed, with choreography by Danny Mefford. The off-Broadway engagement closed on May 29, 2016.

Original Broadway production

The show premiered on Broadway on November 14, 2016, in previews, and officially opened on December 4. After announcing that performances would take place at the Belasco Theatre, in mid-September 2016, producers announced that the show would instead perform at the Music Box Theatre. Michael Park, who originated the role of Larry in the Arena Stage production, returned for the Broadway production (replacing John Dossett who went on to the musical War Paint). All other cast members from the Second Stage production returned for the Broadway engagement. Ben Platt played his last performance on November 19, 2017. Noah Galvin replaced Platt on November 21, 2017, and played until February 2018. Taylor Trensch played two performances in the show before officially replacing Galvin on February 6, 2018. The 2018 Jimmy Award winner, Andrew Barth Feldman, made his Broadway debut, replacing Trensch, on January 30, 2019. Zachary Noah Piser serves at the alternate for the role of Evan and has performances Wednesday and Saturday matinees. After Andrew's run was over, Jordan Fisher assumed the role of Evan Hansen on January 28, 2020.

In November 2018, producers donated several items from the Broadway run of the musical, including a shirt, arm cast, button for The Connor Project, copy of the "Dear Evan Hansen" letter, and a piece of sheet music, to the National Museum of American History at the Smithsonian Institution.

On March 12, 2020, the show suspended production due to the COVID-19 pandemic. Performances resumed on December 11, 2021, with Fisher returning as Evan Hansen. The returning company included all who were there at the time of the shutdown. The show played its final performance on Broadway on September 18, 2022 after 21 preview performances and 1,678 regular performances.

National tour
A US tour launched in October 2018 in Denver Center for the Performing Arts' Buell Theatre in October 2018. Starring Ben Levi Ross in the title role and by December 2018 was scheduled for over 50 cities. It also starred Jessica Phillips in the role of Heidi Hansen, Jared Goldsmith in the role of Jared Kleinman, and Phoebe Koyabe in the role of Alana Beck. Also starring in the tour were Christiane Noll in the role of Cynthia Murphy, Aaron Lazar as Larry Murphy, Marrick Smith in the role of Connor Murphy, Maggie McKenna in the role of Zoe Murphy, and Stephen Christopher Anthony as the alternate Evan Hansen. The second year of the tour began on September 25, 2019, in Milwaukee, with Stephen Christopher Anthony stepping in to the role of Evan Hansen full-time, former Evan/Jared/Connor understudy Noah Kieserman as Connor Murphy, former Zoe/Alana understudy Ciara Alyse Harris as Alana Beck, John Hemphill as Larry Murphy, Sam Primack as the Evan alternate, and Toronto cast alums Stephanie La Rochelle as Zoe Murphy, Jessica Sherman as Heidi Hansen, Claire Rankin as Cynthia Murphy, and Alessandro Costantini as Jared Kleinman. The current touring cast includes Anthony Norman (actor) as Evan Hansen, Alaina Anderson as Zoe Murphy, Coleen Sexton as Heidi Hansen, Lili Thomas as Cynthia Murphy, Nikhil Saboo]] as Connor Murphy, John Hemphill as Larry Murphy, Pablo David Laucerica as Jared Klienman, Micaela Lamas as Alana Beck, Jeffery Cornelius as the Evan Alternate/Jared Understudy, Ian Coursey as the Connor/Jared Understudy, Reese Sebastian Diaz as the Evan/Connor/Jared Understudy, Pierce Wheeler as the Evan/Jared understudy, Valeria Ceballos as the Zoe/Alana understudy, Gillian Jackson Han as the Zoe/Alana understudy, Isabel Santiago as the Heidi/Cynthia understudy, Kelsey Venter as the Heidi/Cynthia understudy, and Daniel Robert Sullivan as the Larry understudy. The tour will play its final performance on July 2, 2023 at the Koger Center for the Arts in Columbia, South Carolina.

Canadian sit-down production

The show played its first international performance at the Royal Alexandra Theatre in Toronto. The production began previews on March 5, 2019, and opened on March 28, 2019. The role of Evan Hansen was played by Robert Markus, and Zachary Noah Piser on Wednesday and Saturday matinees. The cast also included Jessica Sherman as Heidi Hansen, Evan Buliung as Larry Murphy, Claire Rankin as Cynthia Murphy, Alessandro Costantini as Jared Kleinman, Shakura Dickson as Alana Beck, Sean Patrick Dolan as Connor Murphy and Stephanie La Rochelle as Zoe Murphy. Understudies Erin Breen, Malinda Carroll, Jay Davis, David Jeffery, Laura Mae Nason, Kaitlyn Santa Juana and Josh Strobl rounded out the cast. Despite extending its booking period through September, the production closed early on July 21, 2019.

Original London production
A West End production opened at the Noël Coward Theatre from November 2019. The show began previews on October 29, before officially opening on November 19. The role of Evan Hansen was played by Sam Tutty, who won Laurence Olivier Award for Best Actor in a Leading Role in a Musical for his performance. At only 22 years old of age, he became one of the youngest winners in the category. The rest of the cast included Rebecca McKinnis as Heidi Hansen, Lauren Ward as Cynthia Murphy, Rupert Young as Larry Murphy, Jack Loxton as Jared Kleinman, Iona Fraser as Alana Beck, Lucy Anderson as Zoe and Doug Colling as Connor Murphy. Understudies and covers included Marcus Harman as the alternate Evan Hansen, Tricia Adele-Turner, David Breeds, Haydn Cox, Natalie Kassanga, Hannah Lindsey, Mark Peachey, Courtney Stapleton, Alex Thomas-Smith, and James Winter.

The show closed in March 2020 due to the COVID-19 pandemic in the United Kingdom and reopened on October 26, 2021 with all of the cast returning with the exception of Nicole Raquel Dennis, whose role as Alana was taken over by Iona Fraser. The production played its final performance in the West End on October 22, 2022.

Critical response

The musical has received acclaim, particularly for Platt's leading performance, the lyrics and book. The story has also provided and encouraged open dialogue about its themes of mental illness and youth suicide. Dear Evan Hansen is a recipient of the 2015 Edgerton Foundation New Play Award.

Derek Mong, in his review of the musical at the Arena Stage, wrote that the "inventive set design by David Korins...that transforms a small stage into a platform for the most intimate living room where a mother and son share a heart-to-heart to the physical abyss of internet cyberspace... book by Steven Levenson... lyrics and music by Benj Pasek and Justin Paul... heartfelt lyrics with universal appeal joined by the perfect, oftentimes acoustic, accompaniment that can change the mood from somber to celebratory to sinister in a single bar of music." Barbara Mackay in reviewing the Arena Stage production for TheatreMania wrote: "Levenson, Pasek, and Paul set themselves two high, untraditional bars in Evan Hansen: exploring a community's grief and examining a lonely protagonist who desperately wants to connect with that community... Ben Platt is outstanding as Evan... Since the success of the musical depends entirely on whether Evan's solitary nature appears funny or weird, Evan's ability to laugh at himself and make the audience laugh is crucial. Platt is charming as he eternally twists his shirt tails and hangs his head... Although the themes of grief and loneliness are serious, the musical is anything but somber. It addresses challenging facts of life. But from start to finish, when Evan leaves his room and finds an authentic life outside it, Dear Evan Hansen contains far more joy than sadness."

Charles Isherwood, in his review of the Second Stage production for The New York Times, noted: "The songs, by Benj Pasek and Justin Paul (Dogfight, A Christmas Story), strike the same complex notes, with shapely, heartfelt lyrics that expose the tensions and conflicts that Connor’s death and Evan’s involvement cause in both families. The music, played by a small but excellent band on a platform upstage, is appealingly unstrident pop-rock, with generous doses of acoustic guitar, keyboards and strings. It's the finest, most emotionally resonant score yet from this promising young songwriting team." Susan Davidson, in her review of the Arena Stage production for CurtainUp, noted: "it helps to suspend the disbelief that sullen, anti-social teenagers can change quickly. Surely that's a process requiring time-released hormonal adjustments. It is hard to accept that a long-admired-from-afar girl can change Evan's outlook on life so rapidly or that Connor's teenage disequilibrium leads him to do what he does. Coming through loud and clear, however, is the fact that what starts as deceit can be blown totally out of proportion by the Internet where lies are disseminated with lightning speed leaving plenty of victims in their wake [...] The music is pleasant, not terribly original but good enough to get toes tapping. Benj Pasek and Justin Paul's ballads stand out, particularly Heidi's 'So Big/So Small,' Evan's 'Words Fail' and Zoe and Evan's young sweethearts duet 'Only Us.'"

The overall public reception of the show was not without criticism. Some critics argue that it romanticizes or sanitizes mental illness by not naming Evan's diagnosis. It also suggested that the show glorifies suicide, with questions about Connor's death and whether or not Evan's suicide attempt was intentional. Stacey Mindich, lead producer of the Broadway, Tour and West End productions, claimed in her opening speech at the You Will Be Found: A Mental Health Month Symposium event on May 10, 2018, that she and the team did not want the show to be called a "suicide musical" in order to gain an audience.

The protagonist's motives and choices have also been criticized. Jason Zinoman in a piece for Slate argues that the musical "employs many different tactics to prevent us from seeing Evan Hansen as a jerk, but its most audacious is to not allow anyone onstage to see him that way...The choice to give Evan Hansen no comeuppance doesn't make dramatic sense. But you don't need to be too cynical to see its commercial and emotional logic. Not giving voice to anger at Evan Hansen avoids the more unpleasant ramifications of his exploitation of a tragedy for his own personal gain, which might complicate the audience's reaction to him. Evan Hansen isn't as interested in these themes as it is in keeping the focus on the insecurity of the outsider, the nerd, the teenager yearning for acceptance. (To be fair, it is also interested in Evan's mother, who has one of the most moving songs in the show.)"

Hilton Als of The New Yorker was also critical, writing "It would have been amazing if Levenson had continued to dig into Evan's awfulness. Instead, he takes side trips into tired knee-jerk liberalism and therapeutic healing. (One of the more uncomfortable moments in the show is when Alana, a black character, played by Kristolyn Lloyd as a P.C. bully, screams about her invisibility. Levenson and the others are trying to keep up with the times and diversify, but why does it have to feel so forced and tired?) Evan confesses his deceit and makes it clear that all he wanted, really, was to be loved, because of, well, that absent daddy, that inattentive mommy, and the nastiness of the world. With that false move, the show’s creators risk destroying what’s so spikily fascinating about Evan. Still, until the second act, and despite it, Platt gives a performance that binds us to him in the way that Holden Caulfield, that other teen with a voice, did—especially when he said, 'It's funny. Don't ever tell anybody anything. If you do, you start missing everybody.'"

The West End production received many four- and five-star reviews. Writing in The Stage, Tim Bano said "Lucy Anderson makes a striking professional debut as Evan's crush Zoe, and Rebecca McKinnis does strong work as Heidi Hansen", while in Theatre Weeklys five-star review, Greg Stewart commented "Sam Tutty gives the performance of the decade."

Awards and honors

Original Washington, D.C., production

Original off-Broadway production

Original Broadway production

Original West End production

Adaptations

Novelization
The musical was adapted into a young adult novel by actor and singer-songwriter Val Emmich, in collaboration with Pasek, Paul, and Levenson. The novel, which features additional material based on scenes and songs cut from the show's development that flesh out and expand upon the story, was released by Little, Brown Books for Young Readers on October 9, 2018. An audiobook was released on the same date with narrations by Ben Levi Ross, Mike Faist, and Mallory Bechtel. It debuted on the New York Times bestseller list at #2 for the week of October 28, 2018.

Film

On November 29, 2018, it was announced that Universal Pictures optioned the musical to make a film version. It is directed by Stephen Chbosky from a screenplay by Levenson, who will also executive produce with Michael Bederman, Mindich, Pasek and Paul. Marc Platt and Adam Siegel serve as producers. Ben Platt reprised his performance in the title role, as did Colton Ryan as Connor Murphy, a role in which he understudied in the Broadway production. Joining them were Kaitlyn Dever as Zoe Murphy, Julianne Moore as Heidi Hansen, Amy Adams as Cynthia Murphy, Danny Pino as Larry Murphy, Nik Dodani as Jared Kleinman and Amandla Stenberg as Alana Beck. Stenberg will also collaborate with Pasek and Paul on the writing of "The Anonymous Ones," a new song for her character, whose role has been expanded for the film. The character of Larry Murphy was re-conceived as Larry Mora, the step-father of Zoe and Connor rather than their biological father as in the stage version. The character of Jared Kleinman was also re-conceived as "Jared Kalwani" to accommodate Dodani's casting. It will also mark the feature film acting debuts of DeMarius Copes, Gerald Caesar and Isaac Cole Powell, all of whom will play new characters created for the film. Copes will play Oliver, one of Zoe's friends, while Caesar and Powell will play high school students Josh and Rhys. Newcomer Liz Kate is also set to appear in the film as Gemma. Filming began on August 25, 2020, in Atlanta, Georgia and Los Angeles, California. On December 15, 2020, Universal Filmed Entertainment Group chairwoman Donna Langley confirmed that the film will wrap production that month. On May 18, 2021, Ben Platt confirmed that another new song, entitled "A Little Closer," was written for the film, later revealed to have been written for Connor Murphy. The songs "Disappear," "To Break In a Glove," "Anybody Have a Map?" and "Good for You," were omitted, but the latter two, however, are heard instrumentally played by the high school's marching band in a scene early in the film. The ending was also altered for the film, so that, according to Platt, it can hold "the deceitful Evan to account more than the musical did." The film had its world premiere as the Opening Night Gala Presentation of the 2021 Toronto International Film Festival on September 9, 2021, to be followed by a theatrical release on September 24, 2021, including IMAX screenings. The film was not as well-received as the stage version and was, months prior to the premiere, criticized by the public, who accused it of nepotism for the filmmakers' decision to have Platt, at age 27, reprise his role as a teenager. The film had an opening weekend box office of $7.5 million worldwide and finished its run in theaters with $19.1 million. It received four nominations at the 42nd Golden Raspberry Awards, including Worst Director, Worst Actor (for Ben Platt) and Worst Supporting Actress (for Amy Adams).

Books

See also
List of Tony Award- and Olivier Award-winning musicals

References

External links
 
 
 

2015 musicals
Existentialist plays
American plays adapted into films
Off-Broadway musicals
Original musicals
Broadway musicals
Musicals by Pasek and Paul
Works by Steven Levenson
Tony Award for Best Musical
Plays and musicals about disability
Mental health in fiction
Works about depression
Fiction about suicide
Tony Award-winning musicals
Teen musicals
Plays set in the 21st century
West End musicals